Catarman National Airport (Filipino: Paliparang Pambansa ng Catarman, Waray-Waray: Nasudnon nga Luparan san Catarman) , otherwise known as Catarman Airport, is an airport serving the general area of Catarman, located in the province of Northern Samar in the Philippines. The airport is classified as a Class 2 principal (minor domestic) airport by the Civil Aviation Authority of the Philippines, a body of the Department of Transportation that is responsible for the operations of not only this airport but also of all other airports in the Philippines except the major international airports.

Airport upgrade
Catarman National Airport is a priority for national appropriation by the Philippine government. Improvement of its terminal building incurred a budgetary allocation of a 15 million-peso appropriation from the national government.

When Typhoon Nona hit the province of Catarman in 2015, the airport sustained damage. Rehabilitation works were started and the project consists of constructing a new passenger terminal building, taxiway, perimeter fence, expanding the apron, and improvements in the runway. The upgrade works at the airport were completed in August 2021 and were inaugurated on September 2, 2021.

Airport facilities

Terminal building
Prior to the upgrade, the passenger terminal building had a capacity of 50 passengers. After the upgrade, the capacity was increased to 150 passengers and can now accommodate 50,000 passengers annually.

Runway
The airport has a  asphalt/concrete runway that runs in a 04/22 direction. During the upgrade, the runway was overlaid with asphalt.

Apron
The airport has two parking bays and can accommodate two De Havilland Canada Dash 8 (formerly Bombardier Q400) turboprops.

Airlines and destinations

Gallery

See also
List of airports in the Philippines

References

External links

Catarman, Northern Samar
Airports in the Philippines
Buildings and structures in Northern Samar